Kishan Parmar (born 9 April 1992) is an Indian first-class cricketer who plays for Saurashtra. He made his first-class debut for Saurashtra in the 2016-17 Ranji Trophy on 29 November 2016. He made his Twenty20 debut for Saurashtra in the 2016–17 Inter State Twenty-20 Tournament on 30 January 2017.

References

External links
 

1992 births
Living people
Indian cricketers
Saurashtra cricketers